Joel Beck (May 7, 1943 – September 14, 1999) was a San Francisco Bay Area artist and cartoonist. His comic book, Lenny of Laredo, one of the earliest underground comic books of the 1960s, was the first underground comic book published on the West Coast.

Biography

Early life 
Born in Ross, California, Beck grew up in El Sobrante, California, as an ill and bedridden child, who battled a combination of tuberculosis and spinal meningitis. In Richmond, California, while attending De Anza High School, he began a lifelong friendship with the cartoonist Roger Brand. Visiting UC Berkeley, he started submitting cartoons to the campus humor magazine, The Pelican, slipping them under the door to editors who believed he was a college student. Soon he dropped out of high school and never graduated. In the early 1960s, he drew studio cards for Box Cards. He lived for several months in Manhattan in 1962 before returning to the West Coast.

Underground comix 
In the early 1960s, Beck moved into a converted closet in a housing unit near the campus of U.C. Berkeley, known as Haste House, and he continued to do cartoons for The Pelican. During that time he published three underground comic books, Lenny of Laredo, Marching Marvin, and The Profit. The San Francisco Chronicle commented:
In 1965, his first full-length comic book, Lenny of Laredo, was published. It was a satire loosely based on the career of embattled comedian Lenny Bruce. Mr. Beck's protagonist, a child named Lenny, achieves fame and fortune by uttering "obscenities" such as "pee-pee thing," only to find his career in the dumps when the public becomes satiated with his naughtiness. Two other books, Marching Marvin and The Profit, followed. All are collector's items today.

In 1965, humor magazine editors voted to choose the nation's top college cartoonist and gave the honor to Beck. In January 1966, The Pelican reprinted much of his previous work and labeled him "Man of the Decade." His cartoons also appeared in the Berkeley Barb, and he penned a number of handbills and posters for the Jabberwock coffeehouse on Telegraph Avenue in Berkeley. In addition, he was a founding member and regular contributor to the underground anthology Yellow Dog, published from 1968–1973.

In a detailed 1987 self-portrait, Beck depicted himself in an ecstatic state, high on the act of creation, as he labored at his drawing table late into the night, surrounded by his books, artwork, comics, Pepsi and dog.

Fine art 
An accomplished fine artist, Beck created many paintings in acrylics, oils and watercolors—artwork now sought by international collectors.

Death 
Beck died on September 21, 1999, from complications from alcoholism in Point Richmond, California.

Tributes 
Kevin Fagan wrote Beck's obituary for the San Francisco Chronicle:

References

External links

"Jiving with Joel" by Tom Conroy
Beck bio at Lambiek's Comiclopedia

1943 births
1999 deaths
American cartoonists
American comics writers
Artists from the San Francisco Bay Area
20th-century deaths from tuberculosis
People from Ross, California
People from El Sobrante, Contra Costa County, California
Tuberculosis deaths in California
Alcohol-related deaths in California